= Molecular Vision =

- Discipline: Ophthalmology
- Language: English
- Edited by: Jeffrey Boatright, Patrick Cammarata, Qingjiong Zhang, John Nickerson

Publication details
- History: 1995–present
- Publisher: Emory University (United States)
- Frequency: Monthly
- Open access: Yes
- Impact factor: 2.2 (2022)

Standard abbreviations
- ISO 4: Mol. Vis.

Indexing
- ISSN: 1090-0535
- OCLC no.: 35199633

Links
- Journal homepage; Journal Citation Report

Molecular Vision is a peer-reviewed open access medical journal that covers the molecular biology, cell biology, biochemistry, and genetics of the cortical and ocular visual systems. It is published by Emory University and was established in 1995.

== History ==
Molecular Vision was announced in 1994 and published its first article in October 1995.

The journal was established during a period of rapid expansion in molecular biology and genetics research related to vision science, when existing journals had limited capacity to review such work and often experienced long publication delays.

In the early 1990s, scientific publishing relied heavily on print-based systems involving mailed submissions, physical journal issues, and library-based access. The development of the World Wide Web enabled faster communication of scientific findings, and Molecular Vision adopted electronic publishing as a primary mode of distribution.

== Mission and editorial philosophy ==
The journal emphasizes retaining the merits of peer review while eliminating costs for authors and readers, accelerating review timelines, and distributing scientific findings broadly. It has described its guiding principle as publication "by working scientists for working scientists".

The journal also emphasizes accessibility for researchers regardless of financial resources and aims to reduce unnecessary intermediaries in scholarly communication.

== Scope ==
The journal publishes original research articles, technical briefs, and review articles related to the molecular and cellular mechanisms of the visual system, including retinal biology, ocular diseases, visual neuroscience, and biochemical and genetic processes underlying vision.

== Publishing model ==
Molecular Vision provides free and unrestricted access to all published content and does not charge publication fees, including for color images and supplementary materials.

As an electronic journal, it supports multimedia features such as color figures, animations, sound files, supplementary data, and searchable article text.

== Peer review and editorial process ==
Submissions undergo peer review by experts in the field and are evaluated for scientific rigor, originality, and contribution to the field.

The peer-review process involves multiple reviewers and editorial oversight, and manuscripts must present sufficient data, appropriate statistical analyses, and clearly structured figures and tables.

== Article types and manuscript requirements ==
The journal accepts research articles, technical briefs, and review articles, each with defined structural requirements. Research articles and technical briefs typically include sections such as Title Page, Abstract, Introduction, Methods, Results, Discussion, Acknowledgments, and References.

The journal maintains policies for genetic studies, meta-analyses, mutation studies, and data reporting, and requires deposition of sequence and structural data in public databases such as GenBank, GEO, and the Protein Data Bank.

== Data, ethics, and licensing policies ==
Studies involving human subjects must include documentation of ethical approval and informed consent, and animal studies must comply with established care guidelines.

Articles are made freely available under a Creative Commons Attribution-NonCommercial-NoDerivatives license, while authors retain copyright.

== Abstracting and indexing ==
The journal is indexed in MEDLINE, PubMed, and Index Medicus, as well as in Science Citation Index, Current Contents, Biological Abstracts, and Chemical Abstracts.

== Impact and standing ==
As of 2022, the journal has an impact factor of 2.2.

The journal has been described as ranking within the top 5–10% of scientific journals across several bibliometric measures and serves a global research community of approximately 15,000 scientists.

== Archiving ==
Published content is preserved through multiple systems, including PubMed Central, LOCKSS, CLOCKSS, COINS, the Internet Archive, Emory servers, DOIs, DUP systems, and ophthalmology department servers.

== Funding and support ==
The journal is supported by the Abraham J. and Phyllis Katz Foundation, the Emory Eye Center, the Georgia Knights Templar Educational Foundation, and Emory University.

The journal also relies on contributions from a large international group of volunteers who serve as editorial board members and peer reviewers.
